Teófilo Castillo Guas or Guash (2 October 1857, Carhuaz - 7 December 1922, Tucumán) was a Peruvian Impressionist painter, art critic and photographer.

Biography 
He studied at the Seminario de Lima, then continued his studies in Spain and France. Upon returning to Peru, he held an exhibition of his works that were inspired by the Peruvian Traditions of Ricardo Palma.

In 1888, he moved to Buenos Aires, where he was married and worked as a photographer in addition to painting. He went back to Lima in 1906 and opened his own studio.

Two years later, he briefly revisited Spain, then worked as an art critic and portrait painter. He also became artistic director for the magazines Prisma, La Ilustración Peruana and Variedades, where he published color reproductions of his major works.

He was an enthusiastic promoter for the establishment of the Escuela Nacional Superior Autónoma de Bellas Artes and recommended Daniel Hernández Morillo as the most qualified person to become the school's first Director. Hernández received the position, but Castillo was not even invited to join the staff. Disappointed and disillusioned, he left Peru for good in 1920.

He settled in Tucumán, where he became editor of the magazine Sol y Nieve. He also produced a huge canvas depicting General Manuel Belgrano presenting the Flag of Argentina to the Congress of Tucumán in 1816, which was purchased by the Argentine government for 20,000 Pesos. Shortly after, he was named an honorary Professor at the local art academy.

His son, also became a well-known painter.

References

Further reading 
 Fernando Villegas Torres: El Perú a través de la pintura y crítica de Teófilo Castillo (1887-1922), Edición de Asamblea Nacional de Rectores, 2006

External links 

 "Teófilo Castillo: Pintor Incomprendido", an interview with Fernando Villegas Torres from La Republica (2007)
 Review of Villegas' book @ Escuela de mArte

1857 births
1922 deaths
People from Carhuaz Province
History painters
Impressionism
Peruvian emigrants to Argentina
19th-century Peruvian painters
19th-century Peruvian male artists
20th-century Peruvian painters
20th-century Peruvian male artists
Peruvian male painters